Palenga is a town in the Omoro District in the Northern Region of Uganda. It is the site of the district headquarters.

Location
The geographical coordinates of Palenga, Uganda are:02°34'35.0"N,  32°21'16.0"E (Latitude:2.576389; Longitude:32.354444).

Overwiew
Palenga lies on the Kamdini–Gulu Road, which passes through the town in a general south to north direction.

See also
 Bobi, Uganda

References

External links

Populated places in Northern Region, Uganda
Omoro District